Lihiniya MK II is a medium range unmanned aerial vehicle developed by the Sri Lanka Air Force (SLAF) and the Centre for Research and Development (CRD) as a tactical UAV system for the
national defence requirements.

Design
The aircraft is a HTOL UAV with a high wing, twin-boom tail and a single pusher engine with an auto pilot system.  University of Moratuwa is tasked with building the Data link of the UAV. UAV equipped with Dual axes Gyro stabilized Day/Night camera with 10X optical zoom with Target Tracking, Geo Location and Motion Tracking.

References 

Post–Cold War military equipment of Sri Lanka
Single-engined pusher aircraft